Dysdera arganoi is a spider species from the family Dysderidae that is endemic to Italy.

See also
List of Dysderidae species

References

External links

Dysderidae
Endemic fauna of Italy
Spiders of Europe
Spiders described in 2004